Cari Tuna is an American nonprofit businessperson. Formerly a reporter for The Wall Street Journal, she co-founded and works for the organizations Open Philanthropy and Good Ventures.

Education and career 
Tuna was born in Minnesota. The eldest of three children of two doctors, she was brought up in Evansville, Indiana, where she attended Signature School. There, she was student council president, founded an Amnesty International chapter and was co-valedictorian. Tuna later attended Yale University where she wrote for the Yale Daily News. After graduating with a B.A. in political science, she became a journalist for The Wall Street Journal. She currently works full time on Good Ventures, her and her husband's private foundation, as well as Open Philanthropy, a spinoff of a collaboration between Good Ventures and GiveWell.

Personal life 
Tuna met Internet entrepreneur Dustin Moskovitz on a blind date, and they married in 2013. Tuna, along with her husband, is a signer of Bill Gates and Warren Buffett's Giving Pledge. She is a prominent member of the effective altruism community.

References

Further reading

External links 
 Doing philanthropy better - Effective Altruism Global talk with William MacAskill
 Giving away a Facebook fortune - Financial Times interview

Year of birth missing (living people)
Living people
21st-century American businesspeople
21st-century American businesswomen
21st-century American journalists
21st-century philanthropists
American nonprofit businesspeople
American philanthropists
Giving Pledgers
Organization founders
People associated with effective altruism
People from Evansville, Indiana
The Wall Street Journal people
Yale College alumni
People from Minnesota